Goos is a Dutch and Low German masculine given name, a short form of Goswin, as well as a patronymic surname ("son of Goos").

Surname
Abraham Goos (c.1590–1643), Dutch cartographer and publisher, father of Pieter Goos
August Hermann Ferdinand Carl Goos (1835–1917), Danish lawyer, professor and Minister of Iceland
Carl Andreas August Goos (1797–1855), German-Danish painter
Chris Goos (born 1981), American soccer player
 (born 1989), Belgian volleyball player
Fritz Goos (1883–1968), German physicist and astronomer a.o. known for the Goos–Hänchen effect
Marc Goos (born 1990), Dutch racing cyclist
Maria Goos (born 1956), Dutch playwright and screenwriter
Merrilyn Goos, Australian mathematician
Michelle Goos (born 1989), Dutch handball player
Pieter Goos (1616–1675), Dutch cartographer, copperplate engraver, publisher and bookseller
Sofie Goos (born 1980), Belgian triathlete
Given name
Goos Meeuwsen (born 1982), Dutch circus performer

References

See also
Goos (disambiguation)

Dutch masculine given names
Dutch-language surnames
Patronymic surnames